XHPFRT-FM is a radio station on 95.3 FM in El Fuerte, Sinaloa. It is owned by Luz Network and known as La Morrita with a grupera format.

History
XHPFRT was awarded in the IFT-4 radio auction of 2017 and signed on in January 2019. The station's launch returned local radio to El Fuerte after a 34-year absence. The prior local station in El Fuerte, XEORF, relocated its studios to Los Mochis in 1985, though the transmitter remained in El Fuerte.

References

External links

Radio stations in Sinaloa
Radio stations established in 2019
2019 establishments in Mexico